Sousa Group is a Portuguese private business group based in Funchal, Madeira. It is a maritime-port, logistics, energy and tourism operator and is considered the largest Portuguese shipowner.

The Sousa Group includes cargo shipping companies GS Lines, the shipping company Porto Santo Line where it operates with the ship Lobo Marinho. In the port operation area, it is responsible for the Madeira Port Operations Society - OPM and for the Santa Apolónia Terminal - TSL. In the area of shipping agents, it owns PMAR Navegação, PMAR Cabo Verde, PMAR Guinea-Bissau. The company also operates Logislink logistic operation centers and logistic terminals in Madeira, Azores, Alverca, Leixões and Porto Santo. In energy, it operates with Gáslink and WindMad. In addition to the tourism area in Porto Santo with three hotels, two restaurants, a pizzeria, and a beach bar.

Subsidiaries by business division

Shipping 

 Shipping Companies
 GS Lines (passou an incorporar PCI-Portline Containers International, SA, Boxlines e ENM )
 Porto Santo Line - Transportes Marítimos, Lda.

 Ship Management
 Steermar - Shipmanagement Services, Lda

 Shipping Agencies
 PMAR Navegação
 PMAR Guiné-Bissau
 PMAR Cabo Vede

Port operations 
 OPM - Sociedade Operações Portuárias da Madeira, Lda.
 ETP - Empresa de Trabalho Portuário, Lda.
 TSA - Terminal de Santa Apolónia, Lda.
 LCT - Lisbon Cruise Terminals, Lda.

Logistics 

 Logisitcs Terminals
 Logislink Madeira
 Logislink Açores
 Logislink Alverca
 Logislink Matosinhos

 Freight Forwarders
 Logislink - (passou an incorporar as operações dos transitários:

Bitrans - Agência Transitários Madeira, Lda. Bitranlis — Agentes Transitários, Lda. Transaje — Trânsitos e Transportes, Lda. PMAR Logistics, Lda)
 Marmod
 Opertrans Logística

 Road transport
 Opertrans Equipamentos

 Maintenance
 Metal-Lobos - Indústria Metalúrgica, Lda.

Energy 
 Gáslink – Gás Natural, SA
 Windmad - Energias Renováveis, Lda.

Tourism 
 Travel agencies
 Porto Santo Line Travel, Lda.
 Agência de Viagens e Navegação Ferraz

 Hotels
 Hotel Torre Praia ****
 Aparthotel Luamar ****
 Hotel Praia Dourada ***

 Restaurants
 Restaurante Salinas
 Restaurante Pizza N'Areia
 O Corsário Beach Bar
 Restaurante-Bar Ponta da Calheta

References 

Shipping companies of Portugal